I Ride an Old Paint is a traditional American cowboy song, collected and published in 1927 by Carl Sandburg in his American Songbag.

Traveling the American Southwest, Sandburg found the song through western poets Margaret Larkin and Linn Riggs. He wrote that the song came to them in Santa Fe from a cowboy who was last heard of as heading for the Mexican border with friends. He described the song as one of a man in harmony with the values of the American West: "There is rich poetry in the image of the rider so loving a horse he begs when he dies his bones shall be tied to his horse and the two of them sent wandering with their faces turned west."

Members of the Western Writers of America chose it as one of the Top 100 Western songs of all time.  The song is interpolated in Aaron Copland ballet Rodeo, in William Grant Still Miniatures and in Virgil Thomson film score for The Plow that Broke the Plains.

There is disagreement among experts about the meanings of some terms in the song, namely: "snuffy", "fiery", "Dan", and "hoolihan". 
If the word is dam as in Linda Ronstadt's version it is a mother horse. The hoolihan is a backhand loop thrown with a lariat, typically thrown to catch horses. 
Notable recordings of "I Ride an Old Paint" are by the Weavers and Linda Ronstadt.  Loudon Wainwright III has a particularly plaintive version he titled simply "Old Paint" on his 1971 "Album II."

References

American Songbag songs
Western music (North America)

Ken Kesey suggested that "Houlihan" is a synonym for "Maverick".  Meaning: Wild...  Untamed.

This would be in his famous essay "The Day After Superman Died".  Wherein he refers to wild man Neil Cassidy (AKA Dean Moriarity) as...  O'Houlihan.

Moreover, the Lyrics of the song itself, actually suggest the wild cattle, ARE The Houlihan.

Fiery and Snuffy, are the Fire and the Branding Iron.  By which, those purportedly wild cattle, become your cattle.

Standard Lyrics are in the Public Domain.  

I ride an old paint
I lead an old dan
I'm going to Montana
To throw the houlihan
They feed in the coolies
They water in the draw
Their tails are all matted
Their backs are all raw
Ride around
Ride around real slow
The fiery and the snuffy are raring to go

Carl Sandberg published lyrics in 1927, but the song may actually be as much as 80 years older.